The Genkō Shakusho (元亨釈書) is the first Japanese Buddhist history. It was written during the Kamakura period in Classical Chinese by the famous Rinzai monk Kokan Shiren (1278–1346) and in total consists of 30 scrolls.

Kokan Shiren wrote the Genkō Shakusho in 1322; the literal translation of the title is the "Genkō Era Buddhist History." In the introduction to the work, Kokan wrote that he was shamed into writing it after the Chinese monk Yishan Yining expressed his surprise that no such history existed in Japan. The book was first published between 1346–1377. It covers a span of seven hundred years in Japanese Buddhist history and biographies from its introduction into Japan until the late Kamakura period. It was accepted into the Buddhist Tripitaka during the Nanboku-chō period.

Structure 
The Genkō Shakusho has three divisions:

 Biographies scrolls 1–19 with four hundred and six titles of monastic and secular biographies 
 History scrolls 20–26 covering seven hundred years Buddhist history until the late Kamakura period 
 Gazettes scrolls 27–30  covering ten different other types of histories

Notes

References

Sources

Further reading

14th-century books
History books about Buddhism
Kamakura-period books about Buddhism
Kamakura-period history books